
Year 378 (CCCLXXVIII) was a common year starting on Monday (link will display the full calendar) of the Julian calendar. At the time, it was known as the Year of the Consulship of Valens and Augustus (or, less frequently, year 1131 Ab urbe condita). The denomination 378 for this year has been used since the early medieval period, when the Anno Domini calendar era became the prevalent method in Europe for naming years.

Events 
 By place 
 Roman Empire 
 Spring – Emperor Valens returns to Constantinople and mobilises an army (40,000 men). He appoints Sebastianus, newly arrived from Italy, as magister militum to reorganize the Roman armies in Thrace. 
 February – The Lentienses (part of the Alemanni) cross the frozen Rhine and raid the countryside. They are driven back by Roman auxilia palatina (Celtae and Petulantes), who defend the western frontier.
 May – Battle of Argentovaria: Emperor Gratian is forced to recall the army he has sent East. The Lentienses are defeated by Mallobaudes near Colmar (France). Gratian gains the title Alemannicus Maximus.  
 Gothic War: Valens sends Sebastian with a body of picked troops (2,000 men) to Thrace and renews the guerrilla war against the Goths. He chases down small groups of Gothic raiders around Adrianople.
 Fritigern concentrates his army at Cabyle (Bulgaria). The Goths are mainly centred in the river valleys south of the Balkan Mountains, around the towns of Beroea, Cabyle and Dibaltum.  
 July – Frigeridus, Roman general, fortifies the Succi (Ihtiman) Pass to prevent the "barbarians" from breaking out to the north-west (Pannonia).
 Gratian sets out from Lauriacum (Austria) with a body of light armed troops. His force is small enough to travel by boat down the Danube. He halts for four days at Sirmium (Serbia) suffering from fever. 
 August – Gratian continues down the Danube to the "Camp of Mars" (frontier fortress near modern Niš), where he loses several men in an ambush by a band of Alans.
 Fritigern strikes south from Cabyle, following the Tundzha River towards Adrianople, and tries to get behind the supply lines to Constantinople.
 Roman reconnaissance detects the Goths. Valens, already west of Adrianople, turns back and establishes a fortified camp outside the city. 
 The Goths, with their wagons and families vulnerable to attack, withdraw back to the north. Roman scouts fail to detect the Greuthungi cavalry foraging further up the Tundzha valley. 
 Fritigern sends a Christian priest to the Roman camp with an offer of terms and a letter for Valens. The peace overtures are rejected. 
 August 9 – Battle of Adrianople: A large Roman army is defeated by the Thervingi. Valens is killed along with two-thirds of his army.
 The Goths attack Adrianople; they attempt to scale the city walls with ladders but are repelled by the defenders, who drop lumps of masonry.
 The Goths, supported by the Huns, move on to Constantinople. Their progress is checked by the Saracens, recruited from Arab tribes who control the eastern fringes of the empire.
 October – The Greuthungi, faced with food shortages, split off and move west into Pannonia. Followed by their families, they raid villages and farmland.

 Mesoamerica 
 Siyaj K'ak' begins to replace Mayan kings with relatives of Spearthrower Owl, emperor of Teotihuacan.
 Siyaj K'ak' conquers Waka on January 8. 
 Siyaj K'ak' conquers Tikal on January 16.
 Siyaj K'ak' conquers Uaxactun.

 By topic 
 Architecture 
 Valens completes the aqueduct of Constantinople begun by Constantine I.

 Religion 
 Gregory of Nazianzus is ordained bishop of Constantinople.
 Pope Damasus I is accused of adultery but is exonerated by Gratian.

Births 
 Germanus of Auxerre, Christian bishop (approximate date)

Deaths 
 August 9 
 Sebastianus, Roman general (magister peditum)
 Traianus, Roman general (magister militum)
 Valens, Roman consul and emperor (b. 328)
 Flavius Arintheus, Roman politician and general 
 Titus of Bostra, Christian bishop and theologian

References